Canada competed at the 1994 Winter Paralympics in Lillehammer, Norway from March 10 to 19, 1994. 34 athletes competed in all four sports: alpine skiing,  ice sledge hockey, ice sledge speed racing, and Nordic skiing (biathlon and cross-country skiing).

Medalists

See also
Canada at the 1994 Winter Olympics
Canada at the Paralympics

References

External links
Canadian Paralympic Committee official website
International Paralympic Committee official website

Nations at the 1994 Winter Paralympics
1994
Paralympics